Miru may refer to:

Miru (goddess), a death goddess in Polynesian mythology
Miru, Iran, a village in Bandar Abbas County, Hormozgan Province, Iran
Miru River, a river of Romania
Miru, a character from the Pac-Man franchise, introduced in Pac & Pal

People with the given name
Miru Kim (born 1981), American photographer
Miru Shiroma (born 1997), Japanese singer

See also
Milu (disambiguation)